The Tây Sơn Rebellion  was a massive peasant rebellion and an interregnum in the late eighteenth century Dai Viet (present-day Vietnam) against the ruling Vietnamese elites and monarchs, during the context of a 250-year-long disintegration period. The rebellion was led by three Tayson brothers, Nguyễn Nhạc, Nguyễn Huệ, and Nguyễn Lữ, who eventually overthrew all ruling clans and the reigning Lê dynasty in southern and northern Dai Viet.

Background

By the mid-18th century, the Dai Viet kingdom had been fragmented for 200 years. The ruling Lê dynasty monarchs stood as the figurehead of the nation, while Trinh lords in Tonkin and Nguyen lords in Cochinchina were the actual rulers on their own domains. The population expanded to over 7.2 million by the 1740s. European trade to Tonkin was suspended in 1700 while trade in Cochinchina also declined, causing major decreases in revenues for both the lords and their domains. Drought, famines, diseases (smallpox) were frequent, banditry was common in Tonkin during the century. Although there were more than 300,000 followers and converts throughout the kingdom, Catholicism was still promptly limited and suppressed by the government. To keep their revenues, both lords increased taxes on the poor peasantry class. Several major rebellions against Trinh rule led by peasants, even by royal princes and the army occurred constantly. In addition, thousands of Chinese immigrants from the Qing empire poured into northern Vietnam as miners and hijackers, to Southern Vietnam as traders, and made a shift in the kingdom’s economy. 

Catholics were often being targeted and harassed by both north and southern regimes. Villagers who rejected the traditional lifestyle and belief converted to Christianity, which gives the people more liberal ideas, such as gender equality. By the 18th century, the Catholic population in Vietnam was a stunning 400,000. 

In the 1750s-1770s southern Vietnam, foreign trade gradually declined due to a massive inflation caused by lord Nguyen Phuc Khoat’s new zinc coins, which damaged southern revenues. To rescue the economy from stagflation, Nguyen Phuc Khoat increased taxes on peasants by up to 100%, creating dissatisfaction among the population. In 1765, Trương Phúc Loan, an official of the Nguyen court gained power, became regent, used his power to manipulate the Nguyen lord, and generated new troubles in the court. Truong Thuc Loan implemented a new, unpopular head tax (thue dinh) on the populace, disregarded wealth or social status. Southern peasants, Christians, ethnic minorities, especially the Cham and highlanders, and dissents, all now had been holding negative views against the widespread-corruption and taxes of the Nguyen regime, hosted a perfect environment for a new revolution.

End of Nguyen rule in Cochinchina
A charismatic figure, Nguyen Nhac, son of a betel trader and tax collector from the Tay Son village on the Central highlands region, began rallying these peasants to protest and arming his followers, sparked an uprising in An Khe in 1771, declared to cope Truong Thuc Loan. The revolt slowly gained more supporters as it descended to the lowland region and the city of Qui Nhon in the next two years. In September 1773, Nguyen Nhac and his supporters finally took the Qui Nhon citadel. Their numbers raised to 25,000 men, preparing for their ambitious military ventures in the next decades.

In 1774 the Tayson brothers organized a war council in Qui Nhon and then marched to Hoi An. The northern ruler, lord Trinh Sam, saw that as a good opportunity to get rid of his former rival, sending south 30,000 men to join the Taysons and attack the Nguyen lord. Lord Nguyễn Phúc Thuần and the Nguyen family ran for their lives, escaped Hue by ships to Saigon. The northern army advanced to Hue and Hoi An, capturing Truong Phuc Loan. The Tayson leader Nguyen Nhac then sued Trinh Sam for peace in 1775 and pretended to side his Tayson rebel force to the Trinh lord in the banner of chasing the remnant Nguyen regime. 

From 1776 to 1783, the Taysons occasionally launched four southward offensives against the Nguyen remnant during the dry season. In 1777 they successfully captured and executed the entire Nguyen family, left only Nguyen Anh was able to escape with the help of French bishop Pigneau de Behaine. The Nguyen family who once ruled the southern realm for 250 years now collapsed under the revolution. However, when the Taysons had withdrawn during the rainy season, Nguyen loyalists and partisans in the Mekong Delta rallied for Nguyen Anh came back and reasserted their forces in early 1778.

In 1780 Nguyen Anh restored the Nguyen control over the lower Mekong. The Taysons led by Nhac and Hue launched an attack on Saigon in May 1782, destroyed much of the Nguyen efforts. Nhac then carried out a great massacre against the Chinese community in the city, murdered at least ten thousand Chinese civilians. Nguyen Anh and his supporters fled to Siam, where they continued the anti-Tayson struggles with the help of the Siamese monarch Rama I.

Siamese intervention

With aid from Rama I and the Chakri dynasty, Nguyen Anh and his loyalists hopefully set out to retake the lower Mekong. In January 1785, Siamese-Cambodian forces and Nguyen loyalists invaded the lower Mekong. Nguyen Hue and the Taysons were ready for the Siamese-Nguyen attack, waiting in ambush along a stretch of the Mekong River near Mỹ Tho. Nguyễn Huệ lured the overconfident Siamese navy into his trap, destroyed all of the Siamese ships and left few survivors. Nguyen Anh and Behaine then fled back to Bangkok, and then to India to seek help from France.

End of Trinh rule in Tonkin
After vanishing the Nguyen loyalists, Tayson leaders now decided to march north to overthrow the Trinh, restore the Le. In June 1786, Nguyen Hue led the Tayson army to advance to Huế. He quickly overran the Trinh army. On 21 July, the Tayson junior leader marched his troops into the street of Hanoi. Lord Trịnh Khải fled to Sơn Tây but was captured and committed suicide.

In the palace, Hue proclaimed that the Le dynasty was restored, and offered his submission to King Le Hien Tong. The old king in return gave Huệ the position of general and the title of grand duke as well as the hand of the princess (Lê Ngọc Hân) in marriage. A Few days later the king died and his nephew Le Chieu Thong succeeded. The Tayson leader withdrew to Qui Nhon while leaving a defector in charge of supervision of Tonkin.

Conflicts between Tayson brothers
After they had conquered the whole country, the three Tayson brothers decided to partition the kingdom into three parts: central to Nguyen Nhac, north-central (From Thanh Hoa to Hue) to Nguyen Hue, and the Mekong Delta to Nguyen Lu. Frustrated, Hue launched an attack on his older brother in June 1787, which forced Nhac to cede all territories north of Binh Dinh to him. 

As the Tayson brothers’ civil war raged in the south, the defector Nguyễn Hữu Chỉnh switched against and betrayed them, and became the new lord of the north over the weak ruling emperor. Chinh, through emperor Chieu Thong, demanded Nguyen Hue give the land north of Nghe An to him. In Autumn 1787, Hue sent a general named Vũ Văn Nhậm to Hanoi to destroy Chinh; Chinh was captured and executed, the emperor fled to China. Followed Chinh, the ambitious Nham also betrayed Hue. Hue once again sent Ngô Văn Sở, a trustful and loyal general to Hanoi and removed Nham from power.

Chinese intervention and end of the Le dynasty

After fleeing to China in 1788, the emperor Le Chieu Thong had been seeking help from the Chinese empire to reclaim his throne. He argued that since the Vietnamese monarchy was a tributary kingdom to China, China has obligations to protect Dai Viet's ruling dynasty. In October 1788, around 200,000 Chinese Green Banner troops from Yunnan, Guizhou, Guangxi, and Guangdong under the command of Sun Shiyi flooded onto Northern Dai Viet along with the deposed emperor Chieu Thong. They entered Hanoi without facing any hard resistance and place Chieu Thong back to the crown.

Outnumbered, the Taysons immediately retreated their forces to the south, leaving northern Vietnam to the Qing. Hearing the news, Nguyen Hue proclaimed as emperor Quang Trung in December, then stormed his army to the north. The Taysons surprisingly launched major offensives on the Red River Delta during the Lunar New Year festival. Unprepared Chinese and Le loyalists had been completely caught off guard and crushed while were celebrating the festival within a matter of days. Chieu Thong, lost his people’s support, fled to China along with Chinese remnants. Quang Trung and the Tayson brothers finally consolidated their rule overall Dai Viet after 17 years of the revolution, temporarily ended 250-years of Vietnamese fragmentation.

See also

 Vietnamese Civil War of 1789–1802

References

Footnotes

Sources

Further reading

External links

 
 

 
18th-century rebellions
Wars involving Vietnam
Wars involving China
Wars involving Thailand
Wars involving France
Wars involving Cambodia
Wars involving Laos
Military history of Vietnam
Military history of Thailand
1770s conflicts
1780s conflicts
Gia Long
1770s in Vietnam
1780s in Vietnam
18th century in Cambodia
18th century in Laos
China–Vietnam relations
Invasions of Vietnam
Peasant revolts